Originally written for Annie Lennox, "Everytime It Rains" is the fourth single released from Swedish band Ace of Base's album Flowers in the UK, featured on a re-release of the album. The song was written by Rick Nowels, Billy Steinberg and Maria Vidal. The single peaked at number 22 in the UK in April 1999.

It was also remixed for American audiences and promotionally released as a lead single for their Greatest Hits record in April 2000. The single was not released commercially in the United States.

Background
 Clive Davis of Arista Records, who had suggested the band cover "Don't Turn Around" for The Sign, requested for Malin Berggren to record Everytime It Rains for Cruel Summer, as she had no solo songs on the album. Jenny Berggren initially recorded the track when Malin, looking to take a secondary role in the band, ignored Davis's demands. According to Jonas Berggren, once Davis found out that the track had not been recorded by the vocalist of his choosing as instructed, he called Malin and cautioned her regarding Ace of Base's future in the Americas. Linn promptly flew to Norway to record her vocals. However, in continued protest, she only allowed for one take. This one vocal take was used for the released version. "She was sad", Jonas Berggren wrote to fans about the incident in February 2011. "And you can hear she didn't like it [...] it was after that incident that she decided she didn't want to be involved in the music industry anymore."

Critical reception
Quentin Harrison of Albumism described Linn's vocal performance in the song as "gorgeous" in his retrospective review of Flowers. AllMusic editor Bryan Buss called it "poetic". David Browne from Entertainment Weekly wrote that "Everytime It Rains" is "the best song Celine Dion never recorded." Gary Shipes from The Stuart News noted that "the gorgeous ballad" "oozes maturity and confidence". He added that the song could send Ace of Base scurrying to pop glory again."

Track listings
UK CD1
 "Everytime It Rains" (radio edit)
 "Everytime It Rains" (Soul Poets club mix)
 "Travel to Romantis" (Wolf mix)

UK CD2
 "Everytime It Rains" (radio edit)        
 "Into the Night of Blue"
 "Living in Danger" (New Buddha version)

US cassette single
 "Everytime It Rains" (radio edit)
 "Everytime It Rains" (Soul Poets club mix)

Charts

References

1998 songs
1999 singles
Ace of Base songs
London Records singles
Mega Records singles
Polydor Records singles
Song recordings produced by Cutfather & Joe
Songs written by Billy Steinberg
Songs written by Maria Vidal
Songs written by Rick Nowels